Don Diego Beltrán Hidalgo was a seventeenth century Spanish Marrano poet. The son of a Jew from Murcia, he was noted as an editor and commentator of Spanish popular poetry. The following example of the roundelet is from his pen:

"O no mirar ó morir decis, pensamiento amando? mas vale morir mirando que no mirando vivir."

References

 
 Amador de los Rios, Estudios Históricos, Politicos y Literarios sobre Los Judios de España, pp. 551 et seq.

Spanish Jews
Spanish poets
17th-century Jews
17th-century Spanish writers
17th-century Spanish poets
Spanish male poets
17th-century male writers